Stanley James Bowsher (3 October 1899 – 1968) was a Welsh professional footballer who played as a central defender. He was awarded one cap for the Wales national football team.

References

1899 births
1968 deaths
Welsh footballers
Wales international footballers
Association football defenders
Newport County A.F.C. players
Burnley F.C. players
Rochdale A.F.C. players
English Football League players
Footballers from Newport, Wales